Volvo B7 may refer to different 6.7-, 7.1- and 7.3-litre engined bus chassis from Volvo Buses:

Volvo B7F, a front-engined bus chassis with the engine mounted over the front axle
Volvo B7FA, a front-engined bus chassis with the engine mounted before the front axle
Volvo B7L, a low-floor single- and double-decker city bus chassis with a rear vertically mounted engine
Volvo B7LA, articulated version of the B7L
Volvo B7TL, a double-decker city bus chassis with a transverse engine and a shorter rear overhang (comparing with the B7L)
Volvo B7R, a rear-engined bus and coach chassis
Volvo B7RLE, a low-entry single-decker city bus chassis developed from the B7R

B07